Crocodile Man (also known as Kraithong Krapeu Chalawon in Thai or A Water Warrior and a Crocodile Man but preferably "Kropeu Charavan" with an "R" rather than an "L" in Khmer) is a widely acclaimed Cambodian horror film released in 1972 by Hui Keung. It starred famous Khmer actress Dy Saveth and famous singer Pen Ran. It was released in Thailand and Hong Kong along with another 1972 Khmer film, The Snake King's Wife, which brought back a successful grossing. It has become one of the more enduring creations from the nation's pre-communist era and copies are still sold today with English and Chinese subtitles.

Plot
The story is based on the Thai folk lore, "Legend of Kraithong." The relationship of two students who were taught by the same teacher (Ta Esey) for fighting lessons were suddenly split by the fact that each accused the other of being a murderer. Charavann, one of the students who could turn into a crocodile, went under water where he was taught by a water hermit and married two beautiful crocodile girls. He went back to the land in order to seek revenge on Kraitoung, the other student, for killing a woman. One day he took a beautiful daughter of a millionaire, Sompiov Meas, underwater with him, instead of marrying her. However, his two wives refused and put a spell on Sampov Meas. To save Sampov Meas with the intent of marrying her, Kraitoung went underwater to rescue her after many warriors were killed attempting to save the millionaire's daughter. He killed Charavan and his wives for their cruel actions and saved Sampov Meas safely. For his prize, finally, Kraitoung married Sampov Meas, also her sister, Sampov Keav, and lived happily ever after.

Pronunciation differences
Khmer pronounce Kraithoung, Thai pronounces Kraithong.
Khmer pronounce Charavann, Thai pronounces Chalawan.

External links 
 

1970 films
Khmer-language films
1972 horror films
Natural horror films
Cambodian horror films
1972 films
Films about crocodilians